Anna Corderoy (born 28 December 1994) is a British rowing coxswain.

Early life
Corderoy attended Stroud High School in Gloucestershire, where she was Head Girl. In 2013 she went up to the University of Oxford to read for a Bachelor of Arts in English Language and Literature at St Catherine's College.

Rowing
Corderoy started rowing while an undergraduate at Oxford, where she quickly realised that she was better suited to coxing than rowing.
She joined the Oxford University Women's Lightweight Rowing Club for the 2014/15 season, where she coxed the reserve boat, Tethys, in the 2015 Henley Boat Races. Returning for the 2015/16 season she became cox of the Blue boat that beat Cambridge at the 2016 Henley Boat Race. In the summer of 2017, Corderoy coxed the Team Keane Ladies Plate crew to victory in the B final of Tier 2 VIIIs at Marlow Regatta, held at Eton Dorney lake. 
After graduation, Corderoy moved to London to start training as a solicitor. She joined Molesey Boat Club and was invited to join the GB Para-Rowing Squad.

Her first international event was the Gavirate International Regatta in Italy in 2017, where she won as part of the PR3 (formerly LTA) mixed coxed four, comprising Emma Tod, Grace Clough, James Fox, Oliver Stanhope and Anna Corderoy. They finished 17 seconds ahead of the Ukrainian boat in the first final of the day. The PR3 crew repeated this performance on Sunday, with Rob Sargent replacing Stanhope's in the lineup; with an equally convincing margin to Ukraine in second place.

At the 2017 World Rowing Championships in Sarasota in Florida, Corderoy coxed the PR3 crew of Grace Clough, Giedre Rakauskaite, James Fox and Oliver Stanhope, where they won the gold medal, posting a world record time of 6 minutes 55.7 seconds

References

External links 
 
 Anna Corderoy at British rowing

British female rowers
Living people
Coxswains (rowing)
Alumni of the University of Oxford
People_educated_at_Stroud_High_School
1994 births
World Rowing Championships medalists for Great Britain